Denise Marie Quiñones August (born 9 September 1980) is a Puerto Rican actress, model and beauty queen who was crowned Miss Universe 2001. Prior to winning the Miss Universe pageant, she represented her hometown of Lares in the Miss Puerto Rico Universe 2001 pageant. then se proceeded to date former calle 13 former vocalist Residente.

Career
Quiñones won the Miss Universe 2001 pageant in Bayamon, Puerto Rico in 2001. She was crowned by Lara Dutta, Miss Universe 2000 of India and also won the awards of Miss Photogenic, Bluepoint Swimsuit, and Clairol Best Style. She is only the fourth Miss Universe winner to also win Miss Photogenic after Margareta Arvidsson, Margarita Moran, and Janelle Commissiong. Her win came on the Miss Universe pageant's 50th anniversary.  As Miss Universe, Quiñones resided in New York City for a year, enjoying the benefits that all winners of the pageant receive, including complimentary make-up and haircare, a car, complete wardrobe, professional representation by the Miss Universe Organization, a $60,000 scholarship to a New York City film school, and traveling opportunities. Quiñones was the first winner to wear the reputed Mikimoto Crown during its official press presentation by Mikimoto's former brand director, Mr. Toyohiko Miyamoto.

On the night of the Miss Universe 2002 contest, she passed on her crown, once again in Puerto Rico (this time the event was held in the city of San Juan), to Oxana Fedorova of Russia.

Since relinquishing the title, Quiñones attended the School for Film and Television's two-year conservatory acting program. Presently an actress, Quiñones has starred in the Spanish version of Nilo Cruz's play Ana en el trópico (Anna in the Tropics) and continues to hone her talent in the United States. For her role in Anna in the Tropics, she was nominated and awarded an HOLA Award (from the Hispanic Organization of Latin Actors) and an ACE Award.  In October 2005, she was selected for the role of Doña Rosita, in a production of Federico García Lorca's play Doña Rosita la soltera.

Quiñones guest-starred in a season 5 episode of the WB Network television series Smallville. She played Andrea, a masked avenger who fought crime in Metropolis and invited Clark Kent (Tom Welling) to join her in her adventures. On the heels of her Smallville role, she was also cast in the role of "Rachel", a young fighter pilot in the pilot for the TV series Aquaman, which was in development for the CW Television Network. The pilot did not make the fall 2006 lineup.

In November 2006, Quiñones led the off-Broadway cast of Zanahorias (or Carrots in English), a Spanish comedy by Spanish playwright Antonio Zancada. For her role in Zanahorias, she won an ACE Award in 2007.

In July 2008, it was announced that Quiñones would play the part of Lara in the upcoming film I Hope They Serve Beer In Hell, based on the book of the same name. On July 24, 2008, producer Tucker Max announced on the film's official production blog that Quiñones had dropped out due to a scheduling conflict.

In February 2014, Quiñones joined the eighth season of Univision's beauty pageant reality show Nuestra Belleza Latina 2014 as a team mentor where she coaches a team of young women on modeling industry success techniques.

On February 15, 2018, Quiñones was named as the new pageant director for Miss Universe Puerto Rico, taking over responsibilities previously held by former director Desiree Lowry.

Personal life
Quiñones was born in Ponce, Puerto Rico. She dated René Pérez, from the band Calle 13, from 2006 to 2009. 
From 2010 to 2011, Quiñones was in a relationship with Dominican actor Frank Perozo.

Filmography

Films
 Elite (2010) - Special agent Sandra Torres
 La Soga  aka The Butcher’s Wife (2009) - Jenny
 Party Time
 Bad Boys II (2003) (uncredited) - Street walker in Cuba

Television
 Elena Santos - Yarelis (serie de TV de PR)
 Aquaman (2006) TV series - Rachel
 Smallville - "Vengeance Chronicles” (2006) Webisode - Andrea Rojas (Angel of Vengeance)
 Smallville - "Vengeance" (2006) TV episode - Andrea Rojas (Angel of Vengeance)
 The Bedford Diaries (2006) TV series - Mia Thorne (post-production)
 Freddie  - "The Two That Got Away" (2006) TV episode - Denise
 Freddie - "The Mixer" (2006) TV episode - Denise
 Love Monkey - Pilot (2006) TV episode - Gorgeous Woman

Theater
 Pantaleón y las visitadoras
 Ana en el Tropico
 Doña Rosita la Soltera
 Doña Flor Y Sus Dos Maridos
 Zanahorias (Primera edicion)

See also
List of Puerto Ricans
History of women in Puerto Rico

References

External links

 

1980 births
Actresses from Ponce, Puerto Rico
People from Lares, Puerto Rico
Living people
Miss Puerto Rico winners
Miss Universe 2001 contestants
Miss Universe winners
21st-century Puerto Rican actresses
Puerto Rican beauty pageant winners